Béni Saf is a district in Aïn Témouchent Province, Algeria. It was named after its capital, Béni Saf.

Municipalities 
The district is further divided into three municipalities:
Béni Saf
Sidi Safi
El Emir Abdelkader

References 

Districts of Aïn Témouchent Province